Siproeta is a genus of butterflies in the family Nymphalidae found in Central America, the Caribbean, and South America.

Species
There are three recognised species:

References
 "Siproeta Hübner, [1823]" at Markku Savela's Lepidoptera and Some Other Life Forms

 
Nymphalidae of South America
Butterfly genera
Taxa named by Jacob Hübner